Scopula ordinata is a moth of the family Geometridae. It was described by Francis Walker in 1861. It is found in North America, including Alabama, Florida, Georgia, Iowa,
Louisiana, North Carolina and Tennessee.

The larvae feed on Trillium catesbaei.

References

Moths described in 1861
ordinata
Endemic fauna of the United States
Moths of North America